The Yule River is an ephemeral river in the Pilbara region of Western Australia. It was named on 10 August 1861 by the surveyor and explorer Frank Gregory while on expedition in the area, after Thomas Newte Yule, at times farmer of Toodyay, winemaker, Acting Colonial Secretary and Magistrate.

The headwaters of the river rise in the Abydos Plain between the Chichester Range and the Mungaroona Range in the Scientific Reserve then flow in a north-westerly direction crossing the North West Coastal Highway approximately  South of Port Hedland then discharging into the Indian Ocean near Cape Thouin. The river becomes more braided as it flows northward producing a wide alluvial riverbed, in the latter part of the journey the river bifurcates into the Yule and the Yule River West branches.
The river forms a large estuary at the river mouth with an area of 

The river has ten tributaries, including Cockerega River, West Yule River, Pilbara Creek, Friendly Creek and Coorong Creek.

The river flows through a number of permanent pools, including Kangan Pool and Moolkamudda Pool.

During drought conditions the river has recorded zero flow for 2 years duration. The river also occasionally floods, particularly in 1975 when Cyclone Joan inundated the catchment area.

The river's water quality varies depending on the flow, but the average turbidity of the river water is 187 NTU and the average salinity is 105 mg/L.

The traditional owners of the area are the Indjibandi, Njamal or Nyamal peoples.

Prehistoric petroglyphs were found along rock-faces in the Upper Yule River in the 1950s.

Borefield
The Yule River Borefield has been in operation as one of the sources supplying the town of Port Hedland with drinking water.

References

Rivers of the Pilbara region